Regnum may refer to:

 Latin for kingdom or dominion, see realm
 Regnum, Latin word for Kingdom (biology)
 REGNUM News Agency, a Russian news agency
 Champions of Regnum, a computer game
 An online database for PhyloCode